Tunnel warfare involves war being conducted in tunnel and other underground cavities. It often includes the construction of underground facilities (mining or undermining) in order to attack or defend, and the use of existing natural caves and artificial underground facilities for military purposes. Tunnels can be used to undermine fortifications and slip into enemy territory for a surprise attack, while it can strengthen a defense by creating the possibility of ambush, counterattack and the ability to transfer troops from one portion of the battleground to another unseen and protected. Also, tunnels can serve as shelter from enemy attack.

Since antiquity, sappers have used mining against walled cites, fortresses, castles or other strongly held and fortified military positions. Defenders have dug counter-mines to attack miners or destroy a mine threatening their fortifications. Since tunnels are commonplace in urban areas, tunnel warfare is often a feature, though usually a minor one, of urban warfare. A good example of this was seen in the Syrian Civil War in Aleppo, where in March 2015 rebels planted a large amount of explosives under the Syrian Air Force Intelligence Directorate headquarters.

Tunnels are narrow and restrict fields of fire; thus, troops in a tunnel usually have only a few areas exposed to fire or sight at any one time. They can be part of an extensive labyrinth and have culs-de-sac and reduced lighting, typically creating a closed-in night combat environment.

Pre-Gunpowder

Antiquity

Ancient Greece 
The Greek historian Polybius, in his Histories, gives a graphic account of mining and counter mining at the Roman siege of Ambracia:

The Aetolians then countered the Roman mine with smoke from burning feathers with charcoal.

Another extraordinary use of siege-mining in ancient Greece was during Philip V of Macedon's siege of the little town of Prinassos, according to Polybius, "the ground around the town were extremely rocky and hard, making any siege-mining virtually impossible. However, Philip ordered his soldiers during the cover of night collect earth from elsewhere and throw it all down at the fake tunnel's entrance, making it look like the Macedonians were almost finished completing the tunnels. Eventually, when Philip V announced that large parts of the town-walls were undermined, the citizens surrendered without delay."

Polybius also describes the Seleucids and Parthians employing tunnels and counter-tunnels during the siege of Sirynx.

Roman 
The oldest known sources about employing tunnels and trenches for guerrilla-like warfare are Roman. After the Revolt of the Batavi, the insurgent tribes soon started to change defensive practices, from only local strongholds to using the advantage of wider terrain. Hidden trenches to assemble for surprise attacks were dug, connected via tunnels for secure fallback. In action, often barriers were used to prevent the enemy from pursuing.

Roman legions entering the country soon learned to fear this warfare, as the ambushing of marching columns caused high casualties. Therefore, they approached possibly fortified areas very carefully, giving time to evaluate, assemble troops and organize them. When the Romans were themselves on the defensive the large underground aqueduct system was used in the defense of Rome, as well as to evacuate fleeing leaders.

The use of tunnels as a means of guerrilla-like warfare against the Roman Empire was also a common practice of the Jewish rebels in Judea during the Bar Kokhba revolt (132–136 AD). With time the Romans understood that efforts should be made to expose these tunnels. Once an entrance was discovered fire was lit, either smoking out the rebels or suffocating them to death.

Well-preserved evidence of mining and counter-mining operations has been unearthed at the fortress of Dura-Europos, which fell to the Sassanians in 256/7 AD during Roman–Persian wars.

China 
Mining was a siege method used in ancient China from at least the Warring States (481–221 BC) period forward. When enemies attempted to dig tunnels under walls for mining or entry into the city, the defenders used large bellows to pump smoke into the tunnels in order to suffocate the intruders.

Post-classical 
In warfare during the Middle Ages, a "mine" was a tunnel dug to bring down castles and other fortifications. Attackers used this technique when the fortification was not built on solid rock, developing it as a response to stone-built castles that could not be burned like earlier-style wooden forts. A tunnel would be excavated under the outer defenses either to provide access into the fortification or to collapse the walls. These tunnels would normally be supported by temporary wooden props as the digging progressed. Once the excavation was complete, the attackers would collapse the wall or tower being undermined by filling the excavation with combustible material that, when lit, would burn away the props leaving the structure above unsupported and thus liable to collapse.

A tactic related to mining is sapping the wall, where engineers would dig at the base of a wall with crowbars and picks. Peter of les Vaux-de-Cernay recounts how at the battle of Carcassonne, during the Albigensian Crusade, "after the top of the wall had been somewhat weakened by bombardment from petraries, our engineers succeeded with great difficulty in bringing a four-wheeled wagon, covered in oxhides, close to the wall, from which they set to work to sap the wall".

As in the siege of Carcassonne, defenders worked to prevent sapping by dumping anything they had down on attackers who tried to dig under the wall. Successful sapping usually ended the battle, since the defenders would no longer be able to defend their position and would surrender, or the attackers could enter the fortification and engage the defenders in close combat.

Several methods resisted or countered undermining. Often the siting of a castle could make mining difficult. The walls of a castle could be constructed either on solid rock or on sandy or water-logged land, making it difficult to dig mines. A very deep ditch or moat could be constructed in front of the walls, as was done at Pembroke Castle, or even artificial lakes, as was done at Kenilworth Castle. This makes it more difficult to dig a mine, and even if a breach is made, the ditch or moat makes exploiting the breach difficult.

Defenders could also dig counter mines. From these they could then dig into the attackers' tunnels and sortie into them to either kill the miners or to set fire to the pit-props to collapse the attackers' tunnel. Alternatively they could under-mine the attackers' tunnels and create a camouflet to collapse the attackers' tunnels. Finally if the walls were breached, they could either place obstacles in the breach, for example a cheval de frise to hinder a forlorn hope, or construct a coupure. The great concentric ringed fortresses, like Beaumaris Castle on Anglesey, were designed so that the inner walls were ready-built coupures: if an attacker succeeded in breaching the outer walls, he would enter a killing field between the lower outer walls and the higher inner walls.

Coming of gunpowder 
A major change took place in the art of tunnel warfare in the 15th century in Italy with the development of gunpowder, since its use reduced the effort required to undermine a wall while also increasing lethality.

Ivan the Terrible took Kazan with the use of gunpowder explosions to undermine its walls.

Many fortresses built counter mine galleries, "hearing tunnels" which were used to listen for enemy mines being built. At a distance of about fifty yards they could be used to detect tunneling. The Kremlin had such tunnels.

Since the 16th century during assault on enemy positions saps, began to be used.

The Austrian general of Italian origin Raimondo Montecuccoli (1609–1680) in his classic work on military affairs described methods of destruction and countering of enemy saps. In his paper on "the assaulting of fortresses" Vauban (1633–1707) the creator of the French School of Fortification gave a theory of mine attack and how to calculate various saps and the amount of gunpowder needed for explosions.

19th century

Crimean War
As early as 1840 Eduard Totleben and Schilder-Schuldner had been engaged on questions of organisation and conduct of underground attacks. They began to use electric current to disrupt charges. Special boring instruments of complex design were developed.

In the Siege of Sevastopol (1854–1855) underground fighting became immense. At first the allies began digging saps without any precautions. After a series of explosions caused by counter mine action the allies increased the depth of the tunnels but began to meet rocky ground and the underground war had to return to higher levels. During the siege Russian sappers dug  of saps and counter mines. During the same period the allies dug . The Russians expended 12 tons of gunpowder in the underground war while the allies used 64 tons. These figures show that the Russians tried to create a more extensive network of tunnels and carried out better targeted attacks with only minimal use of gunpowder. The allies used outdated fuses so that many charges failed to go off. Conditions in the tunnels were severe: wax candles often went out, sappers fainted due to stale air, ground water flooded tunnels and counter mines. The Russians repulsed the siege and started to dig tunnels under the allies fortifications. The Russian success in the underground war was recognised by the allies. The Times noted that the laurels for this kind of warfare must go to the Russians.

American Civil War

The combat was accordingly known as the Battle of the Crater. From this propitious beginning, everything deteriorated rapidly for the Union attackers. Unit after unit charged into and around the crater, where soldiers milled in confusion. The Confederates quickly recovered and launched several counterattacks led by Brig. Gen. William Mahone. The breach was sealed off, and Union forces were repulsed with severe casualties. The horror of this engagement was portrayed in the Charles Frazier novel, and subsequent Anthony Minghella movie, Cold Mountain.

During the Siege of Vicksburg, in 1863, Union troops led by General Ulysses S. Grant tunnelled under the Confederate trenches and detonated a mine beneath the 3rd Louisiana Redan on June 25, 1863. The subsequent assault, led by General John A. Logan, gained a foothold in the Confederate trenches where the crater was formed, but the attackers were eventually forced to withdraw.

Modern warfare 

The increased firepower that came with the use of smokeless powder, cordite and dynamite by the end of the 19th century made it very expensive to build above-ground fortifications that could withstand any attack. As a result, fortifications were covered with earth and eventually were built entirely underground to maximize protection. For the purpose of firing, artillery and machine gun emplacements had loopholes.

20th century

World War I

Mining saw a particular resurgence as a military tactic during the First World War, when army engineers attempted to break the stalemate of trench warfare by tunneling under no man's land and laying large quantities of explosives beneath the enemy's trenches. As in siege warfare, tunnel warfare was possible due to the static nature of the fighting.

On the Western and Italian Front during the First World War, the military employed specialist miners to dig tunnels.

On the Italian Front, the high peaks of the Dolomites range were an area of fierce mountain warfare and mining operations. In order to protect their soldiers from enemy fire and the hostile alpine environment, both Austro-Hungarian and Italian military engineers constructed fighting tunnels which offered a degree of cover and allowed better logistics support. In addition to building underground shelters and covered supply routes for their soldiers, both sides also attempted to break the stalemate of trench warfare by tunneling under no man's land and placing explosive charges beneath the enemy's positions. Their efforts in high mountain peaks such as Col di Lana, Lagazuoi and Marmolada were portrayed in fiction in Luis Trenker's Mountains on Fire film of 1931.

On the Western Front, the main objective of tunnel warfare was to place large quantities of explosives beneath enemy defensive positions. When it was detonated, the explosion would destroy that section of the trench. The infantry would then advance towards the enemy front-line hoping to take advantage of the confusion that followed the explosion of an underground mine. It could take as long as a year to dig a tunnel and place a mine. As well as digging their own tunnels, the military engineers had to listen out for enemy tunnellers. On occasions miners accidentally dug into the opposing side's tunnel and an underground fight took place. When an enemy's tunnel was found it was usually destroyed by placing an explosive charge inside.

During the height of the underground war on the Western Front in June 1916, British tunnellers fired 101 mines or camouflets, while German tunnellers fired 126 mines or camouflets. This amounts to a total of 227 mine explosions in one month – one detonation every three hours.  Large battles, like the Battle of the Somme in 1916 (see mines on the Somme) and the Battle of Vimy Ridge in 1917, were also supported by mine explosions.

At the beginning of the Somme offensive, the British simultaneously detonated 19 mines of varying sizes beneath the German positions, including two mines that contained  of explosives.

In January 1917, General Plumer gave orders for over 20 mines to be placed under German lines at Messines. Simultaneous explosion of the mines took place at 3:10 a.m. on 7 June 1917. The blast killed an estimated 10,000 soldiers and was so loud it was heard in London. The near simultaneous explosions created  large craters and ranks among the largest non-nuclear explosions of all time. Two mines were not ignited in 1917 because they had been abandoned before the battle, and four were outside the area of the offensive. On 17 July 1955, a lightning strike set off one of these four latter mines. There were no human casualties, but one cow was killed. Another of the unused mines is believed to have been found in a location beneath a farmhouse, but no attempt has been made to remove it. The last mine fired by the British in World War I was near Givenchy on 10 August 1917, after which the tunnelling companies of the Royal Engineers concentrated on constructing deep dugouts for troop accommodation.

The Spanbroekmolen mine created a crater that afterwards measured  from rim to rim.

Chaco War 

On May 10, 1933, Paraguayan troops used a tunnel to attack in the rear of the Bolivian troops. They were victorious.

World War II

Sino-Japanese War 
The term tunnel war or tunnel warfare (地道战) was first used for the guerrilla tactic employed by the Chinese in the Second Sino-Japanese War. The tunnel systems were fast and easy to construct and enabled a small force to successfully fight superior enemies. One particular tunnel network called the "Ranzhuang tunnel" evolved in the course of resisting Japanese counterinsurgency operations in Hebei. Particularly, the Chinese Communist forces or local peasant resistance used tunnel war tactics against the Japanese (and later the Kuomintang during Chinese Civil War). The tunnels were dug beneath the earth to cover the battlefield with numerous hidden gun holes to make a surprise attack. Entrances usually were hidden beneath a straw mat inside a house, or down a well. This allowed for flexible manoeuvers or exits.

The main disadvantage of tunnel war was that usually the Japanese could fill the holes or pour water in to suffocate the soldiers inside the tunnels. This proved to be a major problem but was later solved by installing filters that would consume the water and poisonous gases. It is said that there were even women and children who voluntarily fought in the tunnels.

The movie Tunnel War, which is based on the stories about fighting Japanese in tunnels, made tunnel warfare well known in China. More films were soon produced and adapted in the same setting.

After the war, the Ranzhuang tunnel site became a key heritage preservation unit promoting patriotism and national defense education. It attracted tens of thousands of visitors each year. Most of the villagers were working in tourism service industry, an industry worth US$700,000 each year.

Pacific War 
The first to copy tunnel warfare were the Japanese themselves. In the battles of the Western Pacific, they would maximize their capabilities by establishing a strong point defense, using cave warfare. The first encounter of the US Marines with this new tactic was the island of Peleliu. The invading marines suffered twice as many casualties as on Tarawa, where the old Japanese tactic of defending the beach had been employed. The pinnacle of this form of defense, however, can be found on Iwo Jima, where the Japanese engineered the whole Mount Suribachi with many tunnels leading to defensive emplacements, or exits for quick counterattacks. Tunnel warfare by the Japanese forced the US Marines to adopt the "blowtorch and corkscrew" tactics to systematically flush out the Japanese defenders, one cave at a time.

Korean War
On the Korean Peninsula the underground war reached a massive scale. From experience in the Second World War the US relied upon aviation. North Korean forces suffered heavy losses from air strikes which obliged them to construct underground shelters. Initially underground fortifications were built independently by individual units and their placement was chaotic. Subsequently, underground fortifications were united into a single large system. So for every kilometre of front there were two kilometres of tunnels.

North Korea developed a theory of underground warfare. Manpower, warehouses and small calibre guns were completely housed underground making them less vulnerable to air strikes and artillery. On the surface the many false targets (bunkers, trenches and decoy entrances to the tunnel system) made it difficult to detect true targets forcing US forces to waste ammunition. Directly under the surface spacious barracks were built, allowing whole units to be quickly brought to the surface for a short time and as quickly returned to shelter underground.

North Korea even created underground shelters for artillery. During bombing artillery was rolled into bunkers located inside mountains. When a lull came the guns were rolled back out onto a firing area, fired some shells, and rolled back into the bunker again. Unlike other examples of underground warfare North Korean troops did not just remain in the tunnels. North Korean forces were sheltering in the tunnels from the bombing and shelling and awaiting US bayonet attack. When US forces reached the ground in the area of the tunnels, chosen North Korean units would emerge to engage in hand-to-hand combat taking advantage of their numerical superiority.

To this day the North Korean strategy is to construct as many underground facilities as possible for military use in the event of a US attack. The depth of underground facilities reaches  making them difficult to destroy even with the use of tactical nuclear weapons.

In the Korean War the tactic of tunnel warfare was employed by the Chinese forces themselves. "The Chinese resort to tunnel warfare, and the devastating losses to American soldiers, led to the sealing of tunnel entrances by United Nations Command. According to later prisoner of war interrogations, Chinese officers had killed a number of their own soldiers in the tunnels, because the latter had wished to dig their way out and surrender to the United Nations Command."

Vietnam War
To maintain a full scale guerrilla war in Southern Vietnam, camouflaged bases were used capable of supplying the guerillas for a long period of time. Throughout Southern Vietnam there were secret underground bases that operated successfully. There are reports that every villager was obliged to dig  of tunnel a day. To combat the guerillas in the tunnels the US used tunnel rats.

Part of the Ho Chi Minh Trail was based in caves made of karst.

When Vietnam became a French colony again after the Second World War, the Communistic Vietminh started to dig tunnels close to Saigon. After the French army left (they were defeated at Dien Bien Phu) the tunnels were maintained in case the plausible war with South-Vietnam would start. Ho Chi Minh, leader of North-Vietnam, ordered to expand the tunnels after the Americans entered the war between the North and the South; the tunnels would be used by the Viet Cong. Systems of tunnels were not occupied temporarily for military purpose, but began to contain whole villages of people living permanently underground. The tunnel system contained a complete world belowground, featuring kitchens, hospitals, workshops, sleeping areas, communications, ammunition storage, and even forms of entertainment. The tunnels eventually became a target for American forces because the enemy not only hid in them, but further could strike anywhere in the vast range of the tunnel complex (hundreds of miles) without a single warning before disappearing again.

These tactics were also applied against the Chinese during the Sino-Vietnamese War.

Afghan War
An underground war was actively pursued in the Afghan War. Water pipes extend under the entire Afghan territory. In wartime, Afghans have used these tunnels to both hide and to appear suddenly behind the enemy force. To clear these tunnels, Soviet troops used explosives and gasoline. To combat guerillas in tunnels, both the Soviet Union and the United States have created special forces.

Bosnian War
Between May 1992 and November 1995, during the Siege of Sarajevo in the Bosnian War the Bosnian Army built the Sarajevo Tunnel in order to link the city of Sarajevo, which was entirely cut off by Serbian forces, with the Bosnian-held territory on the other side of the Sarajevo Airport, an area controlled by the United Nations. The tunnel linked the Sarajevo neighbourhoods of Dobrinja and Butmir, allowing food, war supplies, and humanitarian aid to come into the city, and people to get out. The tunnel was one of the major ways of bypassing the international arms embargo and providing the city defenders with weaponry.

21st century
Due to the prevalence of bunker-busting munitions and combined arms maneuver warfare there has been a simple lack of need for such operations since the mid 20th century, making tunneling extremely rare outside of insurgencies (which often cannot use either of the former).

Arab–Israeli Conflict 

Sometimes the ongoing conflict between the Israeli Army and Islamist militants in Hamas-governed Gaza Strip is called a tunnel conflict.

In 2017 the Barrier against tunnels along the Israel-Gaza Strip border began to be built. On October 30 an attack tunnel was located within Israeli borders and was detonated.

Lebanese-Israeli War
In July 2006, a group of Hezbollah fighters crossed from southern Lebanon into northern Israel killing three Israeli soldiers and abducting two, which started the Lebanese-Israeli war. Faced with Israeli's air attacks, Hezbollah needed to create a defensive system that would enable these rocket attacks to continue uninterrupted throughout any conflict with Israel. To do so they created an intricate system of tunnels and underground bunkers, anti-tank units, and explosive-ridden areas.

Hezbollah built a sophisticated network of tunnels with North Korean assistance, with close resemblance to North Korea's own network of tunnels in the demilitarized zone separating the two Koreas. The underground network included twenty-five kilometer tunnels, bunkers, fiber optics communication systems, and storerooms to hold missiles and ammunition. Its capabilities were extended by Iranian supply of advanced weaponry and in-depth training of Hezbollah fighters. Between December 2018 and January 2019, the Israeli military destroyed six tunnels built by Hezbollah along Israel's border during Operation Northern Shield.

Syrian Civil War
During the Syrian civil war, rebel groups like the Islamic Front, Al-Nusra and ISIS dug tunnels and used explosives to attack fixed military positions of the Syrian Armed Forces and allied militias. A notable example is the attack on the Air Force Intelligence Building in Aleppo where on 4 March 2015, rebel forces detonated a large quantity of explosives in a tunnel dug close to or under the building. The building suffered a partial collapse as a result of the explosion which was immediately followed by an armed rebel assault.

Famous tunnel war victories 
 At Jiaozhuanghu (焦庄户) in Ranzhuang, Hebei province, the Japanese Army was defeated in tunnel warfare in 1942, during the Second Sino-Japanese War. It was later made into the movie Didao Zhan by the PRC.

Tunnels after war
Many of the famous war tunnels were later turned into tourist sites due to their historic significance in wars. The Hebei Ranzhuang tunnel is also a famous war tourism site in China.

See also 
 Attrition warfare
 Breastwork (fortification)
 Early thermal weapons
 Explosive mine
 Land mine
 Maneuver warfare
 Sapper
 Sapping
 Siege warfare
 Subterranean warfare
 Trench warfare

Citations

General references 
Ebrey, Walthall, Palais (2006). East Asia: A Cultural, Social, and Political History. Boston: Houghton Mifflin Company.

Ulmer, D. S. (2008). Shaping Operational Design: A Counter to the Growing Trend of Underground Facilities and Tunnel Warfare. Air Command and Staff College.

Further reading

External links 

Vietnam war tunnels at warchapter.com
Vietnamese source on tunnel warfare
Modern US Army source on tunnel warfare
YouTube video of Hill 60 on the Messines Ridge, site of a huge underground explosion

 
Articles containing video clips
Land warfare
Military engineering
Military tactics
Urban guerrilla warfare tactics
Warfare of the Middle Ages